In microeconomic theory, the marginal rate of technical substitution (MRTS)—or technical rate of substitution (TRS)—is the amount by which the quantity of one input has to be reduced when one extra unit of another input is used, so that output remains constant.

Along an isoquant, the MRTS shows the rate at which one input (e.g. capital or labor) may be substituted for another, while maintaining the same level of output. Thus the MRTS is the absolute value of the slope of an isoquant at the point in question.

When relative input usages are optimal, the marginal rate of technical substitution is equal to the relative unit costs of the inputs, and the slope of the isoquant at the chosen point equals the slope of the isocost curve (see Conditional factor demands). It is the rate at which one input is substituted for another to maintain the same level of output.

See also
Marginal rate of substitution (the same concept on consumption side)
Marginal rate of transformation (slope of the production-possibility frontier)

References

Production economics
Marginal concepts

de:Grenzrate der Substitution#Grenzrate der Faktorsubstitution